Jøkulgavlen Ridge is a prominent flat-topped ridge forming the south part of Jokulskarvet Ridge, in the Borg Massif of Queen Maud Land, Antarctica. It was mapped by Norwegian cartographers from surveys and air photos by the Norwegian–British–Swedish Antarctic Expedition (1949–52) and named Jøkulgavlen (the glacier gable).

References

External links

Ridges of Queen Maud Land
Princess Martha Coast